Axel Wibrån (born 9 September 1985) is a Swedish football goalkeeper, currently playing for GAIS. He came to the club in 2007 from Örgryte IS.

External links

1985 births
Living people
GAIS players
Örgryte IS players
Swedish footballers
Association football goalkeepers
Utsiktens BK players